Kadima-Zoran, also known as Kadima-Tzoran, is a local council in the Central District of Israel.

Kadima-Zoran is home to the "Ta'am Shel Pa'am" (A Taste of Old Times) museum for the history of the settlement in the elementary school Nitzanei HaSharon.

History
Before the 20th century, the territory of Kadima-Zoran formed part of the Forest of Sharon, a hallmark of the region’s historical landscape. It was an open woodland dominated by Mount Tabor Oak (Quercus ithaburensis), which extended from Kfar Yona in the north to Ra’ananna in the south. The local Arab inhabitants traditionally used the area for pasture, firewood and intermittent cultivation. The intensification of settlement and agriculture in the coastal plain during the 19th century led to deforestation and subsequent environmental degradation known from Hebrew sources.

Kadima
Kadima was founded on 5 July 1933 as an agricultural settlement at the initiative of Yehoshua Hankin. Most of the settlers were German immigrants. The name means "forward" in Hebrew, and was taken from a Biblical verse (Habakkuk 1:9). The town was declared a local council in 1950.

Tzoran
Tzoran, meaning silicon, was founded in 1992 and was planned by architect Rachel Walden. The settlement was named after a Hasmonean city that had existed in the area. It was first populated in 1994, and declared a local council in 1997.

Notable people

 Yoav Cohen (born 1999), Olympic windsurfer
 Roi Huber (born 1997), basketball player
 David Levin (born 1999), ice hockey player

References

External links
 Official Website

Local councils in Central District (Israel)
2003 establishments in Israel
Populated places established in 2003